Flocarline (foaled 1900) was an American thoroughbred  racehorse. She was sired by August Belmont's stakes winner St. Florian, out of the King Ban mare, Carline.

Flocarline is best known as the first filly to ever win the Preakness Stakes. She did it in a time of 1:44 with William Gannon aboard by a half length over Mackey Dwyer and Rightful.

At three, she placed second in the Broadway Stakes and the Englewood Stakes and third in the Sheridan Stakes.

Flocarline was exported to France in 1910. As a broodmare, she foaled stakes winner Master Robert, who placed second to Fair Play in the Jerome Handicap.

There was a 1 mile Flocarline Handicap named for her at Pimlico Race Course.

References

1900 racehorse births
Racehorses trained in the United States
Racehorses bred in Kentucky
Preakness Stakes winners
Thoroughbred family 12